Ethirkalam is a 1970 Indian Tamil-language film written and directed by M. S. Solaimalai and produced by M. S. Rajendran. The film stars Gemini Ganesan, Padmini, Jaishankar and Vanisri. It was released on 21 February 1970.

Plot

Cast 
Gemini Ganesan
Padmini
Jaishankar
Vanisri
Nagesh
T. S. Balaiah
K. Balaji
Suruli Rajan
S. N. Lakshmi
Ragini

Soundtrack 
The music was composed by M. S. Viswanathan, with lyrics by Kannadasan.

Release and reception 
Ethirkalam was released on 21 February 1970. The Indian Express wrote it "appears to be a film shot during different decades. It has so many stories in it that it is like a book of short stories, pleasant and unpleasant [...] It has all the ingredients that are mistaken for box-office success – car chase, stick fights, fist fights, romantic dance sequences etc."

References

External links 
 

1970 films
1970s Tamil-language films
Films scored by M. S. Viswanathan